Ismail Amirkhizi or Mohammad Ismail Amirkhizi (born 1873, died 16 February 1966) was an Iranian author, poet, researcher and one of the politicians and intellectuals of the Persian Constitutional Revolution. He was the brother of Ali Amirkhizi, a constitutional revolutionary, writer and political activist, member of the Central Committee of the Tudeh Party of Iran.

Life and careers
Ismail Amirkhizi was born in 1873 in "Arvanagh region", Sufian District, East Azerbaijan Province, Iran. Because he lived in Amirkhiz district, northwestern part of Tabriz, he became known as Amirkhizi. He learned the basics of Persian and Arabic literature in various schools, and at the age of fourteen he engaged in fabric business with his father, and then sought to complete his knowledge, so used the information of the great masters of the age. In his youth, he was considered one of the most famous writers in poetry and literature in Azerbaijan. In 1904, he went on Hajj pilgrimage. On his return, he became acquainted with the Constitution and the Republic for the first time in Istanbul through the press and talking to the people.

From the beginning of the constitutional movement, he joined the group of freedom fighters and participated in the Azerbaijan Provincial Association as the representative of the city of Ardabil. After a contention broke out between the Provincial Association and Mohammad Reza Shah, the Provincial Association appointed him as Sattar Khan's secretary, ostensibly, and his advisor, inwardly. He was an effective factor in Sattar Khan's office and Sattar Khan consulted with him in most matters.

After the inauguration of the second term of the National Consultative Assembly, Amirkhizi came to Tehran with Sattar Khan, but after the Atabak Park Incident, which resulted in Sattar Khan being shot and injured, he returned to Tabriz with Sattar Khan's permission. In 1912, as a result of the Russian occupation of Tabriz and the pressure of the supporters of tyranny, he emigrated to Istanbul, and from there he went to Berlin at the invitation of Hassan Taqizadeh and worked in the Committee of Iranian Nationalists. Amirkhizi left for Baghdad in 1915 to help the destinations of Nationalists, and after the fall of Baghdad to the British forces, he returned to Istanbul and stayed there for two years. When the Russians left Azerbaijan, Amirkhizi finally returned to Tabriz after 7 years away from home. In 1920, he joined the Ministry of Education and taught at "Mahmoudieh" High School in Tabriz.

During the Mohammad Khiabani's uprising in 1920, Amirkhizi joined the uprising and became a member of the "uprising board of directors" at Mohammad Khiabani suggestion. He was the one who suggested that the name of Azerbaijan be changed to Azadistan. Amirkhizi was one of Khiabani's supporters and advisers during the uprising (6 April 1920 to 14 September 1920).

After the suppression of the uprising and Khiabani's assassination, Amirkhizi suddenly withdrew from politics and turned to cultural affairs. Until 1934, he was in charge of running the "Mahmoudieh" High School in Tabriz. After that, he was transferred to Tehran and became the director of the Dar ul-Funun high school. In 1942, he returned to Tabriz and became the director of one of Azerbaijan culture centers, but twenty months later he was transferred to Tehran at his own request. In 1946, he was re-elected as the head of the Dar ul-Funun.

In 1947, Amirkhizi was elected as high Inspector of the Ministry of Culture and Islamic Guidance. He retired in July 1949.

Mehdi Bayani, Expert in Persian manuscripts (founder of the National Library of Iran and professor of University of Tehran), has mentioned Ismail Amirkhizi as one of the calligraphers of Nastaliq calligraphy and as one of the students of Mirhossein Khoshnevis (a famous calligrapher in Iran).

Death
He died on 16 February 1966 in Tehran, Iran.

Bibliography
Amirkhizi has left some works in the fields of literature and history:

 , 1940–1960
 , 1931
 , 3 volumes, 1931
 
 , 1960
 

Amirkhizi's articles and poems have been published in various magazines. Some of Amirkhizi's writes published after his death.

 , article, 1945
 , article, 1955
 , article, 1964
 , article, 1972
 , articles, 1972–1975
 , article, 1973
 , article, 1973
 , article, 1973
 , article, 1974
 , article, 1974
 , article, 1974
 , article, 1975
 , article, 1975
 , article, 1975
 , article, 2003
 , article, 2006

See also
 Taqi Rafat
 Ali Reza Abbassi
 Mehdi Bayani

References

External links
 The Provincial Cities in Revolt (ii): Major Abulqasim Lahuti and the Tabriz Insurrection of 1922
 Iranian-Russian Encounters: Empires and Revolutions Since 1800
 Iran and Russian Imperialism: The Ideal Anarchists, 1800–1914

1873 births
1966 deaths
Persian Constitutional Revolution
People of the Persian Constitutional Revolution
Calligraphers from Tabriz
Qajar dynasty
Iranian male writers
19th-century Iranian poets
Poets from Tabriz
20th-century Iranian poets